These are the Billboard magazine Dance/Mix Show Airplay number-one hits of 2022.

See also
2022 in music
List of Billboard Hot Dance/Electronic Songs number ones

References

External links
Dance/Mix Show National Airplay chart (updated weekly)

2022
United States Dance Airplay